Sharon Bridgforth (born May 15, 1958 in Chicago, Illinois) is an American writer working in theater.

Early life
Bridgforth was born in Cook County Hospital in Chicago, Illinois, and moved to South Central Los Angeles when she was 3 years old. She discovered the diversity of the city during her long bus commutes to school.

Career
From 1993 to 1998, Bridgforth worked as the founder, writer, and artistic director of the root wy'mn theatre company. root wy'mn's touring roster included: the Michigan Womyn's Music Festival, The Theater Offensive in Boston, La Peña Cultural Center in Berkeley, California and the Walker Art Center in Minneapolis.

From 2002 to 2009, she served as the anchor artist for the Austin Project, produced by Omi Osun Joni L. Jones and the John L. Warfield Center for African and African American Studies, University of Texas at Austin. Her work, "Finding Voice Facilitation Method" was published in Experiments in a Jazz Aesthetic Art, Activism, Academia, and the Austin Project edited by Osun Joni L. Jones, Lisa L. Moore, and herself.

In 2008, Bridgforth received a National Performance Network Creation Fund award, for delta dandi, co-commissioned by Women & Their Work, in partnership with the National Performance Network. Freedom Train Productions in New York presented a reading of the work in 2008. A workshop production of the work was produced in 2009 at the Long Center in Austin, Texas.

At Northwestern University, as the Andrew W. Mellon Foundation artist-in-residence in the performance studies department, Bridgforth presented a workshop production of delta dandi during the 2009 Solo/Black/Woman performance series. Since 2009, Bridgforth has been resident playwright at New Dramatists, New York.  Her work blood pudding, was presented in the 2010 New York Summerstage festival.

She was the 2010–2012 Visiting Multicultural Faculty member at the Theatre School at DePaul University and is the curator of the Theatrical Jazz Institute at Links Hall, produced by the school, Links Hall and herself.

Roell Schmidt produced Bridgforth's River See.

the bull-jean stories
Published by RedBone Press, the bull-jean stories give cultural documentation and social commentary on African-American herstory and survival. Set in the rural South of the 1920s through the 1940s,  the bull-jean stories uses traditional storytelling and nontraditional verse to chronicle the course of love returning in the lifetimes of one woman-loving-woman named bull-dog-jean.

Love Conjure/Blues
Both a performance and a novel, Love Conjure/Blues places the fiction-form inside a traditional Black American voice, inviting dramatic interpretation and movement within a highly literary text: It is filled with folktales, poetry, haints, prophecy, song, and oral history. Love Conjure/Blues was also published by RedBone Press.

dat Black Mermaid Man Lady
Exists as a show, oracle deck, performance/novel, performance, sung children's book, and artistic mentorship towards homeownership. The performance celebrates the different embodiments of gender through the journey of three characters alongside Yoburba deities Oya, Osun, and Yemaya. The show premiered at the Pillsbury House + Theater in Minneapolis, MN, on May 30, 2018 and ran through June 17, 2018. The performance was written by Sharon Bridgforth, directed by Ebony Noelle Golden, with dramaturgy by Alexis Pauline Gumbs, and vocal composition by Mankwe Ndosi.

In addition to a performance, "dat Black Mermaid Man Lady" is an oracle deck. The deck consists of characters from the performance/novel and features artwork by Yasmin Hernandez. The oracle deck is a working deck that Bridgforth used for a series of weekly readings.

Partnering with Powderhorn Park Neighborhood Association and City of Lakes Community Land Trust, Bridgforth worked with five to seven emerging artist of color to create new works and more toward homeownership.

Awards, residences, and grants
In 1997, Bridgforth's script no mo blues was nominated for an Osborn Award (sponsored by the American Theatre Critic's Association). The bull-jean stories won a Lambda Literary Prize for "Best Book by a Small Press" in 1998. The collection also received a nomination for a Lambda Literary Prize in the category of "Best Lesbian Fiction"  and a nomination from the 1998 American Library Association for "Best Gay/Lesbian Book". Bridgforth was nominated for the 2002-2003 Alpert Award in the theatre category. She has received the 2000 Penumbra Theatre (St. Paul, MN) Playwriting Fellowship and 2001 YWCA Woman Of The Year in Arts Award in Austin, Texas.

A recipient of the 2008 Alpert/Hedgebrook Residency Prize, her work has been supported by the National Endowment for the Arts commissioning program; the National Endowment for the Arts/Theatre Communications Group, playwright-in-residence program; National Performance Network commissioning and community fund; the Paul Robeson Fund for Independent Media; and the Rockefeller Foundation Multi-Arts Production Fund Award. Bridgforth was also the recipient of the Creative Capital Performing Arts Award in 2016.

Personal life
She has a daughter, Sonja Perryman, from a past marriage. A lesbian, her partner is Omi Osun Joni L. Jones. Jones also has a daughter, Leigh Gaymon-Jones, from a past marriage.

Works

Selected publications
 "The love conjure/blues Text Installation" script, anthologized in Blacktino Queer Performance, Northwestern University Press (2016), 
 "delta dandi", anthologized in solo black woman performance, Northwestern University Press (2013), 
 Excerpt from "con flama", anthologized in Windy City Queer: LGBTQ Dispatches from the Third Coast, University of Wisconsin Press (2011), 
 Writing exercises are featured in Wingbeats: Exercises and Practice in Poetry, edited by Scott Wiggerman and David Meischen. Dos Gatos Press, 
 Experiments in a Jazz Aesthetic: Art, Activism, Academia, and the Austin Project, (ed. with Lisa L. Moore and Omi Osun Joni L. Jones), University of Texas Press (2010), 
 "Litany-Blood In The Soil/Texas", anthologized in A Students' Treasury of Texas Poetry, Texas A&M University Consortium Press (2007), 
 "a wo'mn called sir", anthologized in First Person Queer: Who We Are (So Far), Arsenal Pulp Press (2007), 
 excerpt "dyke/warrior-Prayers", anthologized in Voices Rising: Celebrating 20 Years Of Black Lesbian, Gay, Bisexual And Transgender Writing, Other Countries and RedBone Press (2006), 
 "Street/Angels  & Clarity", anthologized in Check The Rhyme: An Anthology Of Female Poets & Emcees, Lit Noire Publishing (2006), 
 "interlude #21: the road to Higher Power", anthologized in Spirited: Affirming the Soul and Black Gay Lesbian Identity, RedBone Press (2006), 
 "Doña Julia", anthologized in Red Light Superheroes, Saints, and Sluts, Arsenal Pulp Press (2005), 
 Love Conjure/Blues, Redbone Press (2004), 
 excerpt from "con flama", anthologized in New Monologues For Women By Women, Heinemann (2004), 
 excerpt from "con flama" anthologized in "Is This Forever, Or What?: Poems &  Paintings From Texas", Greenwillow Books (2004), 
 "bull-jean slipn in" & "bull-jean & trouble", anthologized in Role Call: A Generational Anthology Of Social And Political Black Literature & Art, Third World Press (2001), 
 "dyke/warrior-Prayers" and "blood pudding", anthology in Recreations: Religion And Spirituality In The Lives Of Queer People, Q Press (1999), 
 the bull-jean stories, Redbone Press (1998), 
 Excerpt from sonnata blue, anthologized in Ma-Ka Diasporic Juks, Sister Vision Press (1998), 
 "that beat" anthologized in Does Your Mama Know?: An Anthology of Black Lesbian Coming Out Stories, RedBone Press (1997),

Albums
 amniotic/flow, with daughter,with Sonja Perryman  (2003) available digitally
 the bull-jean stories, available digitally

Theater pieces
 delta dandi
 The love conjure/blues text installation
 con flama
 blood pudding
 dyke/warrior-Prayers
 no mo blues
 lovve/rituals & rage

References

External links
 Sharon Bridgforth's Official Website
 Blip TV-Sharon Bridgforth

1958 births
Living people
American feminists
American women short story writers
20th-century American short story writers
20th-century American dramatists and playwrights
American lesbian writers
LGBT African Americans
Lesbian feminists
American LGBT dramatists and playwrights
LGBT people from Illinois
American women dramatists and playwrights
21st-century American short story writers
21st-century American dramatists and playwrights
Writers from Chicago
Writers from Los Angeles
20th-century American women writers
21st-century American women writers
20th-century African-American women writers
20th-century African-American writers
21st-century African-American women writers
21st-century African-American writers